The Nelson Cemetery Walk is a historic pedestrian walkway in Nelson, Nebraska. It was built in 1912 by J.B. Goodrich with fundraising from the local P.E.O. Sisterhood chapter, and designed by A.W. McReynolds. It spans a ravine which otherwise splits the community. It was originally unpaved. It has been listed on the National Register of Historic Places since December 5, 2002.

References

National Register of Historic Places in Nuckolls County, Nebraska
Buildings and structures completed in 1912
1912 establishments in Nebraska